National Route 242 is a national highway of Japan connecting Abashiri, Hokkaidō and Obihiro, Hokkaidō in Japan, with a total length of 284.9 km (177.03 mi).

History
Route 242 was originally designated on 18 May 1953 from Kushiro to Nemuro. This was redesignated as Route 44 on 1 April 1963.

References

National highways in Japan
Roads in Hokkaido